Soyuz MS-13, also designated ISS flight 59S, was a crewed Soyuz mission launched on 20 July 2019 – the 50th anniversary of the first moon landing –  carrying three members of the Expedition 60 crew to the International Space Station: a Russian commander, an American and a European flight engineer. Soyuz MS-13 was the 142nd flight of a Soyuz spacecraft. It was at one point the last Soyuz flight contracted by NASA in the expectation that subsequent astronaut transport would be provided by the Commercial Crew Program, but in early 2019 NASA sought to purchase two additional Soyuz seats to provide greater certainty given delays in that program.

Crew

Backup crew

Relocation

The Soyuz crew relocated the MS-13 spacecraft from the aft port of the Zvezda module and performed a manual docking on the Poisk module on 26 August 2019. This cleared the way for Soyuz MS-14 to perform an automatic docking on Zvezda, after a faulty signal amplifier on Poisk caused MS-14's first docking attempt to abort on 24 August 2019. The last time a Soyuz spacecraft was relocated was in August 2015 during the Soyuz TMA-16M mission.

References

Crewed Soyuz missions
Spacecraft launched in 2019
2019 in Russia
Spacecraft launched by Soyuz-FG rockets
Spacecraft which reentered in 2020